Frank D. Layman Memorial is a historic monument located at Hunter in Greene County, New York.  It was erected in 1901 to commemorate Frank D. Layman, who died on the site of the memorial on August 10, 1900, while fighting a forest fire. It is pyramidal in shape, four sided, and rises upward from a base approximately seven feet in diameter to approximately 11 feet.

It was listed on the National Register of Historic Places in 2003.

References

Monuments and memorials on the National Register of Historic Places in New York (state)
Buildings and structures completed in 1901
Monuments and memorials in New York (state)
Buildings and structures in Greene County, New York
1901 sculptures
National Register of Historic Places in Greene County, New York